Christiaan Steyn (born 2 September 1897, date of death unknown) was a South African sprinter. He competed in the men's 4 × 100 metres relay at the 1924 Summer Olympics.

References

External links
 

1897 births
Year of death missing
Athletes (track and field) at the 1924 Summer Olympics
South African male sprinters
Olympic athletes of South Africa
People from Malmesbury, Western Cape
Cape Colony people
Sportspeople from the Western Cape